Planetary management is intentional global-scale management of Earth's biological, chemical and physical processes and cycles (water, carbon, nitrogen, sulfur, phosphorus, and others). Planetary management also includes managing humanity’s influence on planetary-scale processes.  Effective planetary management aims to prevent destabilisation of Earth's climate, protect biodiversity and maintain or improve human well-being. More specifically, it aims to benefit society and the global economy, and safeguard the ecosystem services upon which humanity depends – global climate, freshwater supply, food, energy, clean air, fertile soil, pollinators, and so on.

Because of the sheer complexity and enormous scope of the task, it remains to be seen whether planetary management is a feasible paradigm for maintaining global sustainability.  The concept currently has defenders and critics on both sides: environmentalist David W. Orr questions whether such a task can be accomplished with human help and technology or without first examining the underlying human causes, while geographer Vaclav Smil acknowledges that "the idea of planetary management may seem preposterous to many, but at this time in history there is no rational alternative".

Background 

The term has been around in science fiction novels since the 1970s. In 2004, the International Geosphere-Biosphere Programme published “Global Change and the Earth System, a planet under pressure.” The publication’s executive summary concluded: “An overall, comprehensive, internally consistent strategy for stewardship of the Earth system is required”. It stated that a research goal is to define and maintain a stable equilibrium in the global environment. In 2009, the planetary boundaries concept was published in the science journal Nature. The paper identifies nine boundaries in the Earth system. Remaining within these nine boundaries, the authors suggest, may safeguard the current equilibrium.

In 2007, France called for UNEP to be replaced by a new and more powerful organization, the United Nations Environment Organization. The rationale was that UNEP’s status as a programme, rather than an organization in the tradition of the World Health Organization or the World Meteorological Organization, weakened it to the extent that it was no longer fit for purpose given current knowledge of the state of Earth. The call was backed by 46 countries. Notably, the top five emitters of greenhouse gases failed to support the call.

Planetary Ecosystems Accounting models supports that quantifying both emissions sequestration potential as well as emissions productions can provide a better overview on how to render better informed decisions regarding natural ecosystems.

Comparison with other environmental worldviews 
Together with planetary management, stewardship and environmental wisdom are different ways to manage the Earth or "environmental worldviews".

In particular:
 Planetary management focus its attention on humans needs and wants, while stewardship aim at the benefit of humans, organisms and ecosystems of the Earth: in other words, planetary management considers humans as the most important species in the Earth, while stewardship and environmental wisdom consider all the species at the same level of importance.
 To accomplish its scope, planetary management relies on technology and innovation (as stewardship and spaceship-earth worldview), while environmental wisdom relies on the lesson learned from nature.

See also 

 2030 Agenda
 Brundtland Commission
 Climate engineering
 Commission on Sustainable Development
 Earth systems engineering and management
 Earth system science
 Environmental management
 Geo engineering
 Global change
 Global governance
 Holocene extinction
 Macro-engineering
 Megaproject
 Planetary boundaries
 Planetary engineering
 Steady-state economy
 The Venus Project

References

Further reading

External links
 Timeline of the Human Condition.

International sustainable development
Environmentalism
Natural resource management
Earth